The following lists events that happened in 1987 in Iceland.

Incumbents
President – Vigdís Finnbogadóttir 
Prime Minister – Steingrímur Hermannsson, Þorsteinn Pálsson

Events

Births

30 January – Matthías Vilhjálmsson, footballer
4 March – Theódór Elmar Bjarnason, footballer
6 March – Ragnar Þórhallsson, musician
14 May – Ari Freyr Skúlason, footballer.
27 June – Katrín Ómarsdóttir, footballer

Deaths
13 August – Guðmundur Ingólfsson, swimmer (b. 1929).

19 December – Guðmundur Ívarsson Guðmundsson, politician (b. 1909).

References

 
1980s in Iceland
Iceland
Iceland
Years of the 20th century in Iceland